Liam Thomas Garrigan (born 17 October 1981) is an English actor. As a youth, he attended classes at Kingston upon Hull's Northern Stage Company and was a student at Wyke College, Kingston upon Hull. His first television role was as Nic Yorke in the BBC continuing drama series Holby City. He is best known for his roles as Ian Al-Harazi on the Fox series 24: Live Another Day, as King Arthur in the ABC series Once Upon a Time and the film Transformers: The Last Knight, and as Thomas Jopson on AMC’s The Terror. He also provides the voice for Captain Kurt in the role-playing game GreedFall.

Career
Liam was sent to musical theater classes by his mother at an early age, he was five years old when he played a munchkin in Northern Theatre's production of The Wizard of Oz, and he later began, at age seven, to have one-on-one acting lessons with Northern Theatre's founder Richard Green. After attending Endsleigh Primary School and St Mary's, Liam studied at Wyke Sixth Form College, where he focused on theater studies, history and English literature, while continuing acting classes at Northern Theatre, as well as giving performances at the National Theatre and the Edinburgh Festival. During his time at Wyke, he began working on audition pieces for drama school, with his eventual admission into the Guildhall School of Music and Drama, where he trained to be a professional actor.

He has appeared in BBC TV dramas Holby City, Doctors, The Chase and ITV1's Agatha Christie's Marple. He also portrayed Alfred in the Starz TV miniseries The Pillars of the Earth. He appeared in Ultimate Force as Corporal Edward Dwyer during the third series. He also starred in the 2008 and 2010 seasons of Irish drama series, RTÉ's Raw. In January 2011, Garrigan starred in the second series of BBC One's wartime drama serial Land Girls. From 2012 to 2013, Liam starred as Sgt. Liam Baxter in Strike Back, before being cast as Ian Al-Harazi in 2014's 24: Live Another Day. The same year, he appeared in the American 3D action fantasy film, The Legend of Hercules. In January 2014, Garrigan appeared in Silent Witness. In 2015, Garrigan was cast in the recurring role of King Arthur for the fifth season of Once Upon a Time, and later portrayed a different iteration of the character in the 2017 film Transformers: The Last Knight.

Personal life
Garrigan was born in Kingston upon Hull, East Yorkshire, England to Liz and Brian Garrigan, and he is the eldest of three siblings. In September 2016, Garrigan became engaged to singer-songwriter Beth Rowley. The two were married on 1 July 2017 and have two sons named Sidney (2019) and Sonny (2022).

Filmography

References

External links
 

1981 births
Living people
English male television actors
English male stage actors
Male actors from London
Alumni of the Guildhall School of Music and Drama
Male actors from Kingston upon Hull